Sailing/Yachting is an Olympic sport starting from the Games of the 1st Olympiad (1896 Olympics in Athens, Greece). With the exception of 1904 and the canceled 1916 Summer Olympics, sailing has always been included on the Olympic schedule. The Sailing program of 1936 consisted of a total of four sailing classes (disciplines). For each class seven races were scheduled from 29 August 1936 to 8 September 1936 at the Firth of Kiel.

Venue 
For the 1936 Berlin Summer Olympics a choice had to be made between the Berliner Müggel Lake district or the Kiel area. Finally the Organizing committee made the decision in favour of the big boats and picked Kiel.
As a result of the distance between Berlin to Kiel, a special committee for Yachting sprung to life to assist the Organizing Committee for the XIth Olympiad. Since Kiel was mainly a military port this Committee had to cooperate not only with the local authorities but also with the German Fleet Command in Kiel to ensure the success of the races.

Course areas and courses 
One race area was created to the East of Schilksee and two in the harbor area more into the Firth of Kiel. Near the course areas tribunes on barges and on land were placed for spectators.

The sailing was done on the triangular type Olympic courses. The start was made in the center of a set of 8 numbered marks that were places in a circle. This made it possible to begin and finish every race sailing against the wind, regardless of the direction of the wind. During the starting procedure the sequence of the marks was communicated to the sailors. Starting upwind ensure a fair start of every race. This mark system is, at least in certain German lakes, still in use in many places.

The German Navy, was besides the organization of the race management responsible, with the help of the shipping lines, for keeping the race areas free of undesirable traffic.

Competition

Overview

Continents

Countries

Classes (equipment) 
{|class="wikitable" style="text-align:center"
  |-
  |colspan="7"|
  
  |-
  ! Class !! Type !! Venue !! Event !! Sailors !! First OG !! Olympics so far
  |-
  |style="text-align:left"|O-Jolle ||Dinghy      ||Kiel                     ||||Max. 1Max. 1 substitute ||1936||1
  |-
  |style="text-align:left"|Star      ||Keelboat||Kiel||||Max. 2Max. 2 substitutes||1932||2 
  |-
  |style="text-align:left"|6 Metre                   ||Keelboat    ||Kiel||||Max. 5Max. 5 substitutes||1908||7
  |-
  |style="text-align:left"|8 Metre||Keelboat    ||Kiel||||Max. 6Max. 6 substitutes||1908||7
  |-
  |colspan="7"|'Legend:  = Mixed gender event
  |-
  |colspan="7"|
  
|}

Race schedule

 Medal summary 
Source:

 Medal table 

 Notes 
 A floating transmission station was used for reporting the race events to shore.
 New media was also used in the protest room. On the footage made from a Zeppelin, for the film Olympia'' of Leni Riefenstahl, an incident was observed by the jury between Sweden and Finland in race No. VI of the 8 Metre. As result both teams were disqualified.

Other information

Sailing 
 This Summer Olympics established sailing as a full mature Olympic sport after a long struggle to get a unified International standard set of rules.
 Each Olympic Gold medalist was also given a plant during the prize giving ceremony.
 Spain withdrew from sailing before the opening ceremony, as part of its boycott of the 1936 Summer Olympics.
 The Swiss 6 Metre was eliminated for all races since the helmsmen turned out not to be an amateur.
 Many protests in the Metre classes were filed. Speculations were made about whether this was due to the scoring system. One of the reasons was probably the close racing.
 The Olympic flame was burning on a Hanseatic galleon in the harbor of Kiel.
 In total a number of 257 participants were entered. 169 of them competed, the others were reserves or team managers and so on.

Sailors 
During the sailing regattas at the 1936 Summer Olympics among others the following persons were competing in the various classes:
 , Daan Kagchelland in the O-Jolle is among the first sailors that did physical exercises on structural basis. Therefore, he was able to compensate his light body weight during heavy air races.
 , Alfried Krupp von Bohlen und Halbach in the 8 Metre, played an important role for Germany in World War II.
 , Peter Scott in the O-Jolle became later one of the presidents of the IYRU. He also was the one who advised to put the trapeze on the Flying Dutchman.

Further reading

References 

 
1936 Summer Olympics events
1936
1936 in sailing
20th century in Schleswig-Holstein
Sailing competitions in Germany